Barbara Dare (born February 27, 1963) is an American former pornographic actress. She was one of the industry's initial contract performers with Essex Video and Vivid Entertainment and is an AVN and XRCO Hall of Fame inductee.

Personal life
Dare was born in Wichita Falls, Texas. After her father, a dentist, left the Air Force, the family moved to Wayne, New Jersey. She was raised in the Jewish faith. Early in her professional career, Dare self-identified as a lesbian, having personal relationships with women.

Career
Dare began appearing in adult films in the mid-1980s after meeting people who were involved in the adult film industry at Plato's Retreat and also made appearances in magazines such as Hustler, Swank, and High Society. In 1989, she joined fellow adult film actress Stephanie Rage as authors of a monthly article for Swank.

Dare was one of the top adult film stars of the 1980s. She appeared in scenes with several (at the time) top adult films stars, including Tracey Adams and Ginger Lynn.  She became one of the first women in the industry to sign an exclusivity contract with Essex Video for 10 movies a year and an annual salary of $150,000 and would later leave that studio to sign with Vivid Entertainment and become one of the earliest Vivid Girls. Dare's final film was Bratgirl (1992); she retired in 1994.

Jerry Butler stated in his autobiography that Dare had a "commanding screen presence"  while on set, in spite of her smaller physical stature.

Dare also worked as a stripper, commanding a $10,000 weekly salary.

Appearances
Dare was interviewed in 1987 for the episode of the television news series Frontline regarding the death of Shauna Grant.

She also had minor roles in mainstream productions such as the Roy Scheider and Ann-Margret film 52 Pick-Up in 1986 and the live-action/animated comedy-horror B-movie Evil Toons (where she was credited as "Stacey Nix") in 1992.

In the August 1992 issue of Esquire, Dare was profiled in their annual feature "Women We Love".

Selected filmography

Awards
 1987 AVN Award - Best New Starlet
 1989 AVN Award - Best Actress, Video (Naked Stranger)
 1990 AVN Award - Best All-Girl Sex Scene, Video (True Love) with April West
 AVN Hall of Fame inductee
 XRCO Hall of Fame inductee

References

External links
 
 
 

1963 births
Living people
American female erotic dancers
American pornographic film actresses
Lesbian pornographic film actresses
American lesbian actresses
LGBT people from New Jersey
LGBT people from Texas
People from Wayne, New Jersey
Pornographic film actors from New Jersey
21st-century American LGBT people
21st-century American women
Jewish American actresses
LGBT Jews